Gunning for Justice is a 1948 American Western film directed by Ray Taylor and written by J. Benton Cheney. The film stars Johnny Mack Brown, Raymond Hatton, Max Terhune, Evelyn Finley, I. Stanford Jolley and House Peters Jr. The film was released on November 7, 1948 by Monogram Pictures.

Plot

Cast           
Johnny Mack Brown as Johnny Mack
Raymond Hatton as Banty
Max Terhune as Alibi Parsons
Evelyn Finley as Winnie Stewart
I. Stanford Jolley as Blake
House Peters Jr. as Kirk Wheeler
Ted Adams as Lem Tolliver
Bud Osborne as The Cook
Dan White as Sheriff
Bob Woodward as Jarvis 
Carol Henry as Petrie
Boyd Stockman as Smoky
Dee Cooper as Luke 
Bill Potter as Potter

References

External links
 

1948 films
American Western (genre) films
1948 Western (genre) films
Monogram Pictures films
Films directed by Ray Taylor
American black-and-white films
1940s English-language films
1940s American films